The Indy Fuel are a minor league ice hockey team in the ECHL that began play in the 2014–15 season. Based in Indianapolis, Indiana, the Fuel play their home games at the Indiana Farmers Coliseum on the Indiana State Fairgrounds. They are affiliated with the NHL's Chicago Blackhawks and the AHL's Rockford IceHogs.

History
On November 11, 2013, the ECHL's board of governors approved the expansion membership application of the Indy Fuel for admission to the league for the 2014–15 season. On October 17, 2014, the Fuel played their franchise opening game against the Fort Wayne Komets, reigniting the Indianapolis-Fort Wayne rivalry after 15 years in a 4–5 defeat.

On March 7, 2016, the Indy Fuel fired inaugural head coach Scott Hillman and named Bernie John as interim head coach for the remainder of the 2015–16 season. On April 8, 2016, the interim tag was removed and John was named head coach and vice president of hockey operations for the 2016–17 season.

At the end of the 2017–18 regular season, the Fuel qualified for their first playoff berth. Entering as a fourth seed in the Central Division with 78 points, they were swept by the Toledo Walleye in the division semifinals. The team failed to qualify for the playoffs in the following 2018–19 season and the team released head coach Bernie John. The Fuel hired Doug Christiansen as the general manager and head coach for the 2019–20 season following his first season as head coach of the Manchester Monarchs.

On September 14, 2022, it was announced that the Fuel would be moving to a new 8,500-seat arena to be built in Fishers, Indiana, in time for the 2024–25 season.

Season-by-season records

Players

References

External links

 
2013 establishments in Indiana
ECHL teams
Ice hockey teams in Indiana
Ice hockey clubs established in 2013
Sports teams in Indianapolis
2